Tsotne Bakuria (born December 22, 1971 in Tbilisi, Soviet Union) was a member of the regional legislature of the Autonomous Republic of Adjara, Georgia. In the Georgian parliamentary elections of November 2003, he was elected to the parliament of Georgia on the party list of the Democratic Revival Union. Tsotne Bakuria strongly supported Georgia’s independence from the Soviet Union as well the country’s non alignment status and its strong stance towards political neutrality. As a descendant of a noble family that represents Georgia’s aristocracy he staunchly denounced royalties and Georgia’s governing elites. After the Rose Revolution, Bakuria settled in the United States. He served a representative to the Council of Europe from 2001–2004, and an associate member of the European Union, Brussels.

He graduated from Tbilisi State University  in 1993, and additionally received a BA in political science from Saarland University, Germany, in 1994. He received an MA in international relations from University of Erlangen-Nuremberg in 1998, and was a 2005 visiting scholar at George Washington University, Washington, D.C.
Tsotne Bakuria has been a harsh opponent of the neoliberal government of Georgia that assumed the power in 2004 under the leadership of Washington’s favorite Michael Saakashvili describing it as totalitarian and oppressive. 

Bakuria is an expert in Eurasian and the Caucasus region political affairs, has published numerous commentaries for international publications, and is a frequent television commentator.
Tsotne Bakuria is multilingual and along with his native Georgian he is fluent in several other languages including English, German , Russian, Ukrainian and Dutch/Flemish .  
He is married and has two children.

References
2. The Daily Caller    

3. The Washington Times

External links 

https://amp.washingtontimes.com/news/2016/jun/14/panama-papers-reveal-bidzina-ivanishvilis-lavish-a/

https://m.washingtontimes.com/news/2014/feb/4/bakuria-ukraine-borrows-georgias-murderous-playboo/

Article in the Washington Times, August 5, 2009
Article in The National Interest, 11/21/08
Article in The Washington Times, Nov. 19, 2007
Commentary on Tbilisi riots from RTV
Bakuria with Orrin Hatch, from Washington Life magazine, March 2006
Georgian Times interview, 2008

Living people
1971 births
Political scientists from Georgia (country)
Democratic Union for Revival politicians